Christian Günther II, Count of Schwarzburg-Sondershausen-Arnstadt (1 April 1616 – 10 September 1666) was  Count of Schwarzburg-Sondershousen.  From 1642 until his death, he ruled a part of the County around his residence in Arnstadt.

Life 
Count Christian Günther II was the son of Count Christian Günther I of Schwarzburg-Sondershausen (1578-1642), and his wife, Countess Anna Sibille (1584-1623), the daughter of Count Albert VII of Schwarzburg-Rudolstadt.

After the death of his father, the brothers were divided the County among themselves on and Christian Günther II received the entire Upper Schwarzburg-Sondershausen with his residence of Arnstadt.

Marriage and issue 
In 1645, Christian Günther II married since 1645 to Sophia Dorothea (d. 1685), the daughter of Count George of Mörsperg and Beffort, and they had the following children:
 Sibille Juliane (1646-1698), married Count Henry I of Reuss-Obergreiz (1668-1681)
 Sophia Dorothea (1647-1708), married Ernest, Count of Stolberg-Ilsenburg (1650-1710)
 Clara Sabine (1648-1698)
 Christine Elisabeth (1651-1670)
 Catherine Eleanor (1653-1685)
 John Günther IV (1654-1669), his successor, died unmarried and without issue

See also 
 House of Schwarzburg
 Schwarzburg-Sondershausen

References 
 Friedrich Apfelstedt: Das Haus Kevernburg-Schwarzburg von seinem Ursprunge bis auf unsere Zeit, Arnstadt, 1890
 Dr. Kamill von Behr: Genealogie der in Europa regierenden Fürstenhäuser, Leipzig, 1870

House of Schwarzburg
Counts of Schwarzburg-Sondershausen
1616 births
1666 deaths
17th-century German people